Mycobacterium fallax is a species of the phylum Actinomycetota (Gram-positive bacteria with high guanine and cytosine content, one of the dominant phyla of all bacteria), belonging to the genus Mycobacterium.

Description
Gram-positive, nonmotile and acid-fast rods (0.5 – 1 µm long) except for a small number (less than 20%) of cyanophil forms.

Colony characteristics
Large, eugonic, buff coloured and rough colonies (Löwenstein-Jensen medium at 30 °C).
Cauliflower-like morphology, resembling M. tuberculosis colonies. Cord formation at the edges of colonies (Middlebrook 7H10 agar at 30 °C).

Physiology
Rapid growth at 30 °C, but not at 37 °C, on Löwenstein-Jensen or Middlebrook 7H10 media.
Susceptible to ethambutol, rifampin and kanamycin.
Resistant to isoniazid, pyrazinamide and streptomycin.

Differential characteristics
Similarities to M. tuberculosis include colony morphology, thermolabile catalase, positive nitrate reductase; differences are negative reactions for niacin production and rapid growth at 30 °C.

Pathogenesis
Not known.  Biosafety level 1.

Type strain
Isolated from environmental sources in France and the former Czechoslovakia.  Strain ATCC 35219 = CCUG 37584 = CIP 81.39 = DSM 44179 = JCM 6405.

References

External links
Type strain of Mycobacterium fallax at BacDive -  the Bacterial Diversity Metadatabase

Acid-fast bacilli
fallax
Bacteria described in 1983